The women's 100 yards at the 1962 British Empire and Commonwealth Games as part of the athletics programme was held at the Perry Lakes Stadium on Saturday 24 November and Monday 26 November 1962.

23 runners competed in four heats in the first round, with the top three runners from each heat qualifying for the semifinals. There were two semifinals, and only the top three from each heat advanced to the final.

The event was won by England's Dorothy Hyman ahead of Doreen Porter from New Zealand and Australian Brenda Cox who won bronze. Hyman won the final in a slow time of 11.2 seconds running into a headwind of 5.8  m/s. It was the first time since 1934 that this event was not won by an Australian.

Records

Round 1

Heat 1

Heat 2

Heat 3

Heat 4

Semifinals

Semifinal 1

Semifinal 2

Final

References

Women's 100 yards
1962